Sky Xul was a king (ajaw) of Maya city-state Quiriguá in Guatemala, who ruled 785 – c. 795.

Biography
Sky Xul became the reigning lord of Quiriguá 78 days after the death of K'ak' Tiliw Chan Yopaat, who is thought to have been his father.

His reign lasted from 10 to 15 years and was a period of continued activity. In most of the Maya region cities already were suffering terminal decline, engulfed by the Classic Maya collapse, but in Quiriguá Sky Xul dedicated three great zoomorph sculptures and two altars, considered marvels of Maya stoneworking. Sky Xul died some time between 795 and 800.
 
Jade Sky succeeded Sky Xul and was the last ruler of Quiriguá.

Notes

References

 

Kings of Quiriguá
8th century in Guatemala